For other uses: Antotohazo (disambiguation)

Antotohazo  is a town in Analamanga Region, in the  Central Highlands of Madagascar, located north-west from the capital of Antananarivo.

References

Populated places in Analamanga